Acrisione is a genus of the tribe Senecioneae and the family Asteraceae and a native of Chile, described as a genus in 1985. There is only one known species, Acrisione denticulata.

formerly included
 Acrisione cymosa - syn of  Senecio cymosus 
 Acrisione denticulata var. pilota  - syn of  Senecio yegua

References

External links

Senecioneae
Flora of Chile
Monotypic Asteraceae genera